Patrick Browne (1888 – 24 July 1970) was an Irish Fine Gael politician. A farmer and merchant, he was first elected to Dáil Éireann as a Fine Gael Teachta Dála (TD) for the Mayo North constituency at the 1937 general election. He was re-elected at each following general election until he lost his seat at the 1954 general election. He stood again at the 1957 general election but was not elected.

References

1888 births
1970 deaths
Fine Gael TDs
Members of the 9th Dáil
Members of the 10th Dáil
Members of the 11th Dáil
Members of the 12th Dáil
Members of the 13th Dáil
Members of the 14th Dáil
Politicians from County Mayo
20th-century Irish farmers